Latha Hegde is an Indian-born New Zealand actress who works mainly in Kannada also works in Telugu and Tamil films. Hegde did her first film Tuntari in 2016, opposite Nara Rohith. She then did her first film in Tamil Oh Andha Naatkal as a lead alongside Suhasini Maniratnam, Khushbu, Raadhika and Urvashi. Hegde then made her Kannada debut opposite Vinay Rajkumar in Ananthu vs Nusrath (2017).

Filmography

References

External links
 

Actresses from Bangalore
Actresses in Kannada cinema
Living people
Indian film actresses
Kannada actresses
21st-century Indian actresses
University of Auckland alumni
Actresses in Telugu cinema
Actresses in Tamil cinema
People from Uttara Kannada
Year of birth missing (living people)